Keravnos Thesprotiko F.C. is a Greek football club, based in Thesprotiko, Preveza.

The club was founded in 1954. They will play in Football League 2 for the season 2013-14.

External links
Keravnosthe.blogspot.gr

Football clubs in Epirus